The American Academy of Diplomacy is a private, nonprofit, non-partisan, elected organization whose active membership is limited to men and women who have held positions of high responsibility in crafting and implementing American foreign policy. They have served the United States as chiefs of mission in major embassies abroad, and/or equivalent high-level foreign policy positions in Washington.

Founded in 1983, the Academy focuses the expertise of its members on the pursuit of excellence in the practice of American diplomacy.

In its early years, the Academy provided the U.S. Senate Foreign Relations Committee with commentary on the qualifications of those nominated by the President as ambassadors, but today it only does so in exceptional circumstances, such as if the Board of Directors feels strongly about a nominee's lack of qualifications to be ambassador.

The academy is financially supported by its members, and by grants from foundations and corporate contributors.

Leadership
 Chairman: Thomas A. Shannon
 Vice-Chairman: Alonzo Fulgham
 President: Ronald E. Neumann
 Treasurer: Nicholas A. Veliotes
 Secretary: Molly Williamson
 Board of Directors: Frank Almaguer, Liliana Ayalde, Joyce Barr, Avis Bohlen, Michele Bond, Thomas D. Boyatt, Johnnie Carson, Charles Cobb, Kathleen Doherty, Harry Geisel, Stuart Holliday, Robert Hunter, Janice Jacobs, Laura Kennedy, Patrick Kennedy, Deborah McCarthy, George Moose, Tibor P. Nagy, John Negroponte, Wanda Nesbitt, Anne Patterson, Charles A. Ray, Marcie Ries, Charles Rivkin, Pamela Spratlen, Gregory Starr, Francis X. Taylor, Harry K. Thomas, Jr., Mike Van Dusen, Jenonne Walker, Alexander Watson, Tony Wayne
 Managing Director: Maria Reissaus
 Former Chairmen: Sol M. Linowitz, Frank C. Carlucci, Rozanne Ridgway, Lawrence S. Eagleburger, Max M. Kampelman, Samuel Lewis, Joseph J. Sisco, Arthur Hartman, Thomas R. Pickering
 Former Presidents: Bruce Laingen, Brandon Grove, David H. Popper, David D. Newsom

Awards
The Walter and Leonore Annenberg Award for Excellence in Diplomacy
The Academy hosts an annual awards luncheon at the Department of State to recognize an individual or group who has made exemplary contributions to the field of American diplomacy.

The Arthur Ross Award for Distinguished Reporting and Analysis of Foreign Affairs
Since 2004, the Academy has presented the Arthur Ross Award to journalists who have produced the most compelling and insightful pieces concerning American diplomatic efforts.

The Douglas Dillon Award for Distinguished Writing on American Diplomacy
Since 1995, the Academy has awarded an annual prize for a book of distinction on the practice of American diplomacy. This award honors those who broaden public understanding of the need for excellence in American diplomacy.

Programs

Present
 FSOT Career Track Virtual Series
 Michigan Ambassadors Forum
Texas Tech Ambassadors Forum 
Nebraska Ambassadors Forum
Arthur Ross Discussions of American Diplomacy 
Joseph J. Sisco Memorial Forum
Ambassador Speaker Series

Past
America's Diplomats screening and discussion
Hushang Ansary Forums: Global Strategies for a Global America
Diplomacy and Democracy
Diplomatic Professional Education and Training Project
Integrating Instruments of Power and Influence

Publications
Bringing America's Multilateral Diplomacy into the 21st Century (2022)
Changing the Risk Paradigm for U.S. Diplomats (2021)
Strengthening the Department of State (2019)
Support for American Jobs: Requirements for Next-Generation Commercial Diplomacy Programs (2016)
American Diplomacy at Risk (2015)
Diplomacy in a Time of Scarcity (2012)
First Line of Defense: Ambassadors, Embassies, and American Interests Abroad
Coalitions: Building and Maintenance
Commercial Diplomacy and the National Interest
Preventing Genocide

Scholarships

Past
The Philip Merrill Scholarship
The Academy, in collaboration with Johns Hopkins University's Paul H. Nitze School of Advanced International Studies (SAIS), awarded the Philip Merrill Fellowship for a winning essay on the practice of American diplomacy. The fellowship provided one half of SAIS tuition for each of two years of study. The last year for this award was 2013.

The Leonard Marks Foundation Award for Creative Writing on American Foreign Policy
Participants in this contest submitted essays on specific challenges to American diplomacy, and proposed policy recommendations to address them. The Academy selected three winners at differing award levels. The last year for this award was 2009.

References

External links
 Academy of Diplomacy

Non-profit organizations based in Washington, D.C.
Diplomacy
Advocacy groups in the United States
Nonpartisan organizations in the United States